Martin Kambulu Pinehas is a Namibian military officer who is serving as the Chief of the Defence Force, he previously served as commander of the Namibian Air Force. He was appointed the commander of the Air wing of the Namibian Defence Force in 2000. He has over 3700 flight hours of experience, including 700 as an instructor.

Military career
Pinehas joined SWAPO's armed wing  People's Liberation Army of Namibia in 1980 and was deployed to the  Cadet Military Academy in Cuba which he completed in 1981 and was appointed  deputy commander there. Between 1982 and 1983 he was serving at the PLAN Headquarters in Lubango, Angola. He was then sent for jet flying training in Libya between 1984 and 1989. His career in the Namibian Defence Force started in 1993 after Namibia's independence when he was inducted with the rank of Lieutenant. In 1994 he was appointed as the commanding officer of the 1st Air Wing squadron with the rank of Major. In 1998 he was promoted to the rank of lieutenant colonel and appointed as the chief of staff of the Air Wing. In 2000 he was promoted to colonel and appointed as Air Wing Commander. In 2002 he was appointed as  Air Force Commander. In 2005 when the Air Force was commissioned he was promoted to Brigadier General. The rank of air vice-marshal was bestowed in 2008. On the  31 March 2020 he was promoted to air marshal and appointed as Chief of Defence Force becoming the first non Army General to occupy the position.

Martin's professional qualifications includes a diploma in air operations, from Air University (United States Air Force) and a Bachelor of Commerce degree as well as a Master of Business Administration from Regent Business School.  He earned several military service awards, commendation and medals.

Honours and decorations
 Most Excellent Order of the Eagle, Third Class.
  Mandume Ya Ndemufayo Operation Medal
  Air Cadre Medal 
  Air Force Longevity Medal
  Air Force Commander's Exemplary Medal
  NDF Commendation Medal
  Santos-Dumont Merit Medal

|-

|-

|-

|-

References

Living people
Namibian Air Force air marshals
1962 births